Al Maqal railway station is the main train station in Basrah. It links the rail network of the south to Baghdad and the north of Iraq.

See also 

 Iraqi Republic Railways
 Railway stations in Iraq

References

Railway stations in Iraq
Buildings and structures in Basra